Starochikeyevo (İśke Sikäy) is a rural locality (a selo) in Michurinsky Selsoviet, Sharansky District, Bashkortostan, Russia. The population was 218 as of 2010. There is 1 street.

Starochikeyevo is located 31 km northeast of Sharan (the district's administrative centre) by road. Chishma-Karan is the nearest rural locality.

References 

Rural localities in Sharansky District